The 1988–89 Algerian Cup is the 27th edition of the Algerian Cup. USM Alger are the defending champions, having beaten CR Belcourt 5–4 on penalties in the previous season's final.

Round of 64

Round of 32

Round of 16

Quarter-finals

Semi-finals

Final

Match

References

Algerian Cup
Algerian Cup
Algerian Cup